The premise of a text such as a book, film, or screenplay is the initial state of affairs that drives the plot.

Most premises can be expressed very simply, and many films can be identified simply from a short sentence describing the premise. For example: A lonely boy is befriended by an alien; A small town is terrorized by a shark; A small boy sees dead people.

See also 
 Elevator pitch
 Log line

References 

Film production
Narratology